"Guns for Hire" is a song by Australian hard rock band AC/DC, from their album Flick of the Switch, released on 15 August 1983. Written by band members, Angus Young, Malcolm Young and Brian Johnson, it was also released in August as a single with "Landslide" as the B-side. It charted at No. 37 on the UK Singles Chart, and No. 84 on the United States Billboard Hot 100. It also reached No. 19 in Ireland.

Cash Box said that "raucous as ever, the track includes a matured guitar solo and is fused with a high rock ‘n’ roll energy."

The track served as the opening song during the band's performances on the tour in support of Flick of the Switch, but has never been performed on any other AC/DC tours since. A promotional video was produced for the song, which featured drummer Simon Wright rather than Phil Rudd. Rudd had left the band during the recording of Flick of the Switch and was replaced by Wright before the start of the tour.

Personnel
 Brian Johnson – lead vocals
 Angus Young – lead guitar
 Malcolm Young – rhythm guitar, backing vocals
 Cliff Williams – bass guitar, backing vocals
 Phil Rudd – drums

Charts

References

AC/DC songs
1983 songs
Songs written by Angus Young
Songs written by Brian Johnson
Songs written by Malcolm Young
Atlantic Records singles